Onchidella reticulata is a species of air-breathing sea slug, a shell-less marine pulmonate gastropod mollusk in the family Onchidiidae.

Description

Distribution

References

 Dayrat, B. (2009) Review of the current knowledge of the systematics of Onchidiidae (Mollusca: Gastropoda: Pulmonata) with a checklist of nominal species. Zootaxa 2068: 1–26

External links

Onchidiidae
Gastropods described in 1885